Jalan Parlimen (formerly Club Road) is a major road in Kuala Lumpur, Malaysia.

List of junctions

Roads in Kuala Lumpur